Causal action may refer to:
 Causation (disambiguation)
 The causal action principle